Rasisalai United Football Club (Thai สโมสรฟุตบอล ราษีไศล ยูไนเต็ด), is a Thai football club based in Mueang, Sisaket, Thailand. The club is currently playing in the Thai League 3 Northeastern region.

History
In 2019, the club was established and competed in Thailand Amateur League Northeastern region but they couldn't be promoted to the higher division.

In early 2022, the club competed in Thailand Amateur League Northeastern region, using the Sisaket Provincial Stadium as the ground. At the end of the season, the club could be promoted to the Thai League 3 as the Thailand Amateur League champion. They use the Sisaket Provincial Stadium as a ground to compete for the T3 in the 2022–23 season.

In late 2022, Rasisalai United competed in the Thai League 3 for the 2022–23 season. It is their first season in the professional league. The club started the season with a 4–2 home win over Surin Khong Chee Mool and they ended the season with a 4–0 away win over the Surin Khong Chee Mool. The club has finished third place in the league of the Northeastern region. In addition, in the 2022–23 Thai League Cup Rasisalai United was defeated 0–2 by Udon United in the first qualification round, causing them to be eliminated.

Stadium and locations

Season by season record

P = Played
W = Games won
D = Games drawn
L = Games lost
F = Goals for
A = Goals against
Pts = Points
Pos = Final position

QR1 = First Qualifying Round
QR2 = Second Qualifying Round
R1 = Round 1
R2 = Round 2
R3 = Round 3
R4 = Round 4

R5 = Round 5
R6 = Round 6
QF = Quarter-finals
SF = Semi-finals
RU = Runners-up
W = Winners

Players

Current squad

Honours

Domestic competitions

League
 Thailand Amateur League
 Winners (1): 2022

References

External links
 Thai League official website
 Club's info from Thai League official website

Association football clubs established in 2019
Football clubs in Thailand
Sisaket province
2019 establishments in Thailand